Emiliya Moiseyevna Treyvas (Emma Treyvas, ; August 26, 1918 – January 8, 1982) was Soviet Jewish stage and film actress. Her roles were mostly of comic character.

During the 1960s she played in 17 films. Her best known film role was Tryndychikha in the 1967 Soviet musical comedy film Wedding in Malinovka.

Her husband was actor Vladimir Mamontov.

She died on January 8, 1982, and her ashes are at the columbarium of Donskoy Cemetery, Moscow.

Filmography

References

1918 births
1982 deaths
Actors from Volgograd
Russian Jews
Soviet actresses
Jewish actresses